Earwig is the common name for the insect order Dermaptera.

Earwig may also refer to:

 Earwig (band), an indie rock band from Columbus, Ohio
 Earwig (Blake Babies album), 1989
 Earwig (Pegboy album), 1994
 Earwig (film), 2021 film
 Earwig Music Company, an American independent record label founded in 1978
 Mag Earwhig! (Guided by voices album), 1997
 Mrs Earwig, a character in the Discworld novels of Terry Pratchett
 In-Ear Audio Monitor

See also
earworm